The Journal of Clinical Epidemiology is a peer-reviewed journal of epidemiology. The journal was originally established as the Journal of Chronic Diseases in 1955 as a follow-up to Harry S. Truman's 1951 Presidential Task Force on national health concerns and the subsequently written Magnuson Report.

Under the editorial leadership of Alvan Feinstein and Walter O. Spitzer, the title of the journal was changed to the Journal of Clinical Epidemiology with the January 1988 issue. The current editors are André Knottnerus (Netherlands School of Primary Care Research) and Peter Tugwell (University of Ottawa).

According to the Journal Citation Reports, the journal has a 2020 Impact Factor of 6.437, ranking it 5th out of 108 journals in the category "Health Care Sciences & Services".

References

External links
Main Site

Epidemiology journals
Elsevier academic journals
Monthly journals
Publications established in 1955
1955 establishments in the Netherlands